Nilamber-Pitamber University (NPU) is a state university located in Medininagar, Jharkhand, India.

Colleges

Constituent colleges 

 G.L.A. College, Medininagar
 J. S. College, Medininagar
 Y.S.N.M. College, Medininagar
 S.S.J.S.N. College, Garhwa
 Degree College, Manika, Latehar
 Model Degree College, Garhwa

Permanent Affiliated Colleges 

 Banwari Sahu College, Latehar
 A.K. Singh College, Japla
 S.P.D. College, Garhwa
 B.S.M. College, Bhawanathpur
 Majdur Kisan College, Panki
 Gopinath Singh Mahila College, Garhwa

Affiliated Colleges 

 Sukhdeo Sahay Madheshwar Sahay Degree College, Tarhassi
 Gulab Chand Prasad Agrawal Degree College, Sadma, Chhattarpur
 Sankar Pratap Dev Degree College, Nagar Untanri, Garhwa
 Sant Tulsi Dash College, Rehla, Palamu
 Vananchal College of Science, Garhwa
 St. Xavier College, Mahuadand, Jharkhand
 Maa Nagina Shahi Mahila Mahavidyalaya, Nagaruntari
 Haji Naeemul Haque Degree College Dhurki, Garhwa
 Shonebhadra Adarsh Degree College, Kandi

Medical College 

 Palamu Medical College & Hospital, Medininagar

Dental College 

 Vananchal Dental College & Hospital, Garhwa

B.ED. Colleges 

 G.L.A. College B.Ed. Course, Medininagar
 Indra Singh B.Ed. College, Garhwa
 Dinesh College of Education, Garhwa
 Kumaresh International B.Ed. College, Rajwadih, Palamu
 Jyoti Prakash Mahila B.Ed. College, Chiyanki, Palamu
 Elite Public B.Ed. College, Medininagar, Palamu
 S.B. Pandey Sanathan Teachers Training College
 R.K. Vyawasaik Sikshan Sansthan, Sonpurwa, Garhwa
 Sidhnath B.Ed. College
 Pt. Jagnarayan Tripathi B.Ed. College
 Gopinath Singh B.Ed. College, Latdag, Meral
 K.P.N.S. B.Ed. College, Chainpur

LAW College 

 Bhishma Narain Singh Law College, Medininagar, Palamu

Nursing Colleges 

 Vananchal College of Nursing, Farathia, Garhwa
 Arogyam Hospital & College of Nursing, Garhwa
 Aviram G.V.S.S. College of Nursing, Chandwa

References

External links

 
Medininagar
2009 establishments in Jharkhand
Educational institutions established in 2009
State universities in Jharkhand